Motherwell Football Club is a Scottish professional association football club from the North Lanarkshire town of Motherwell, competing in the Scottish Premiership. This is an overview of all the statistics and records involving Motherwell since its official formation on 17 May 1886.

Honours

Sources:

Records and statistics

Firsts
 First match: Motherwell 3-2 Hamilton Academical (17 May 1886)
 First match played at Roman Road: Motherwell 3-2 Hamilton Academical (17 May 1886)
 First match played at Dalziel Park: Motherwell 3-3 Rangers (9 March 1889)
 First match played at Fir Park: Motherwell 1-8 Celtic (3 August 1895)
 First match played (as a professional side): Motherwell 4-1 Hamilton Academical (5 August 1893) 
 First match played in league (as a professional side): Motherwell 4-1 Clyde (12 August 1893)
 First match played in Scottish Premier Division: Motherwell 1-1 Ayr United (30 August 1975)
 First match played in SPL: Motherwell 1-0 St Johnstone (1 August 1998)
 First match played in Scottish Premiership: Hibernian 0-1 Motherwell (4 August 2013)
 First match played in Scottish Cup: Cambuslang 6-1 Motherwell (11 September 1886)
 First match played in Scottish League Cup: Motherwell 0-1 Queen of the South (21 September 1946)
 First match played in Lanarkshire Cup (as Motherwell): Motherwell 3-3 Albion Rovers (20 November 1886)
 First match played in Texaco Cup/Anglo-Scottish Cup: Motherwell 1-0 Stoke City (14 September 1970)
 First win in SPL: Motherwell 1-0 St Johnstone (1 August 1998)
 First draw in SPL: Motherwell 1-1 Dunfermline Athletic (22 August 1998)
 First defeat in SPL: Rangers 2-1 Motherwell (15 August 1998)
 First win in Scottish Premiership: Hibernian 0-1 Motherwell (4 August 2013)
 First defeat in Scottish Premiership: Motherwell 1-3 Aberdeen (12 August 2013)
 First match played in Europe: 1991–92 European Cup Winners' Cup vs  GKS Katowice (18 September 1991)
 First goal scored in SPL: Jered Stirling vs St Johnstone (1 August 1998)
 First goal scored in Scottish Premiership: Henri Anier vs Hibernian (4 August 2013)
 First goal scored in Europe: Steve Kirk vs  GKS Katowice (1 October 1991)
 First hat-trick scored in SPL: John Spencer vs Aberdeen (20 October 1999)
 First hat-trick scored in Europe: Jamie Murphy vs  Flamurtari (23 July 2009)

Individual
 Most Capped player (Scotland): Stephen O'Donnell (25 caps)
 Most Capped player (Other): Stephen Craigan (54 caps for Northern Ireland)
 Youngest Player: William Hunter 17 years (1958)
 5,000th SPL Goal: Scott McDonald versus Falkirk (Season 2005-2006)
 Most Clean Sheets in a season (All Competitions): Darren Randolph (20 clean sheets, Season 2010-2011)

Appearances
 Most League appearances: Bob Ferrier, 626, 1917–1937
 Most League appearances since World War Two: Steven Hammell, 583, 1999–2006, 2008–2018
 Most SPL appearances: Steven Hammell, 399, 1999–2006, 2008–2013
Most Premiership appearances: John Sutton, 38, 2013–present
 Most European appearances: Steven Hammell, 19, 2008–present

Goals
 Most League goals: Hughie Ferguson, 284, 1916–1925
 Most League goals since World War Two: Pat Quinn, 83, 1955–1962
 Most League goals in a season: Willie MacFadyen, 52, 1931/1932 season
 Most SPL League goals: Scott McDonald, 42
 Most SPL League goals in a season: Michael Higdon, 26
 Total number of hat-tricks scored in the SPL: 9, 2012/2013 season
 Most hat-tricks scored in the SPL: Michael Higdon, 3
 Most hat-tricks scored in the SPL in a season: Michael Higdon, 2, 2012/2013 season
 Most Premiership League goals: Louis Moult, 39
 Most Premiership League goals in a season: John Sutton, 22
 Most European goals: Jamie Murphy, 7
 Most European goals in a season: Jamie Murphy, 4, 2009/2010 season

Scorelines
 Highest Scoring home win: 12-1 versus Dundee United, 1954
 Highest Scoring away win: 8-1 versus Thistle, 1894
 Highest Scoring home draw: 6-6 versus Dumbarton, 1954 and Hibernian, 2010
 Highest Scoring away draw: 3-3 versus St Mirren, 2009 and Hearts, 2011
 Highest Scoring home loss: 0-7 versus Celtic, 1982
 Highest Scoring away loss: 0-8 versus Aberdeen, 1979
 Highest home aggregate: 8-5 versus Queen of the South, 1938
 Highest away aggregate: 8-3 versus Partick Thistle, 1971
 Highest Scoring home win in domestic cup football: 9-1 versus Falkirk, 1962
 Highest Scoring away win in domestic cup football: 8-1 versus Huntly, 1939
 Highest Scoring home draw in domestic cup football: 4-4 versus Clyde, 1960
 Highest Scoring away draw in domestic cup football: 5-5 versus Aberdeen, 1953
 Highest Scoring home loss in domestic cup football: 0-6 versus Celtic, 1984
 Highest Scoring away loss in domestic cup football: 7-1 versus Morton, 1898
 Highest home aggregate in domestic cup football: 8-3 versus Kilmarnock, 1933 and Albion Rovers, 1948
 Highest away aggregate in domestic cup football: 6-5 versus Airdriehill, 1889
 Highest Scoring European home win: 8-1 Versus  Flamurtari, 2009
 Highest Scoring European away win: 4-1 Versus  HB Tórshavn, 1994
 Highest Scoring European away draw: 1-1 Versus  Aalesunds, 2010
 Highest Scoring European home loss: 1-3 Versus  MYPA, 1995 and  Steaua București, 2009
 Highest Scoring European away loss: 0-3 Versus  Steaua București, 2009 and  Panathinaikos, 2012

Points
Most points in a season: 
 Two for a win: 66 Season 1932-1933
 Three for a win: 70 Season 2013-2014

Fewest points in a season: 
 Two for a win: 15 Season 1983-1984
 Three for a win: 28 Season 2002-2003

Sequences
 Longest sequence of wins: 12, 1968
 Longest sequence of draw: 5, 1975 and 1988
 Longest sequence of defeats: 9, 1979
 Longest sequence of clean sheets: 7, 1996
 Longest run of games without scoring a goal: 8, 1995-1996
 Longest run of games without a win: 19, 1988
 Longest run of games without a draw: 34, 1953-1954
 Longest unbeaten run: 30, 1930
 Longest run of games without keeping a clean sheet: 35, 1905-1906
 Longest run of games scoring at least one goal: 56, 1932-1934

Basic Statistics
 Most wins in a single season (Top Flight): 30, 1931-1932
 Most draws in a single season (Top Flight): 17, 1977-1978
 Most defeats in a single season (Top Flight): 25, 1983-1984
 Fewest wins in a single season (Top Flight): 4, 1983-1984
 Fewest defeats in a single season (Top Flight): 2, 1931-1932
 Most goals scored in a single season (Top Flight): 119, 1931-1932
 Fewest goals scored in a single season (Top Flight): 28, 1995-1996
 Most goals conceded in a single season (Top Flight): 86, 1938-1939, 1978-1979
 Fewest goals conceded in a single season (Top Flight): 31, 1931-1932
 Number of wins in European football: 9 (7 home, 2 away) 
 Number of draws in European football: 1 (1 away)
 Number of defeats in European football: 18 (9 home, 9 away)
 Number of aggregate wins in European football: 5 
 Number of aggregate defeats in European football: 9 
 Total number of goals scored in European football: 32 (20 home, 12 away) 
 Total number of goals conceded in European football: 37 (20 home, 17 away) 
 Total number of clean sheets in European football: 6 (3 home, 3 away) 
 Total number of games without scoring in European football: 15 (7 home, 8 away) 
 Best performance in European football: play-offs, season 2010-2011 and 2012-13

All-time Statistics
 Total number of wins (SPL): 159
 Total number of draws (SPL): 115
 Total number of defeats (SPL): 216
 Total number of goals scored (SPL): 592
 Total number of goals conceded (SPL): 744
 All-time goal difference (SPL): −147
 All-time points (SPL): 654
 All-time league placing (SPL): 6TH
 Total number of wins (Premiership): 22
 Total number of draws (Premiership): 4
 Total number of defeats (Premiership): 12
 Total number of goals scored (Premiership): 64
 Total number of goals conceded (Premiership): 60
 All-time goal difference (Premiership): +4
 All-time points (Premiership): 70
 All-time league placing (Premiership): 2ND

Lasts
 Last match played at Dalziel Park: Motherwell 3-2 Royal Albert (31 May 1895)
 Last match played in Scottish Football League Premier Division: Motherwell 1-2 Aberdeen (9 May 1998)
 Last goal scored in Scottish Football League Premier Division: Ian Ross vs Aberdeen	(9 May 1998)
 Last match played in Scottish Premier League: St Johnstone 2-0 Motherwell (19 May 2013)
 Last goal scored in Scottish Premier League: Chris Humphrey vs Ross County (12 May 2013)
 Last match played outside the top-tier (Level 1) of Scottish Football: Forfar Athletic 0-0 Motherwell (11 May 1985)
 Last match played in Texaco Cup/Anglo-Scottish Cup: St Mirren 3-0 Motherwell (9 August 1978)

Attendances
 Highest home attendance: 35,632 versus Rangers, 1952
 Highest home SPL attendance: 12,944 versus Celtic, 22 May 2005
 Lowest home SPL attendance: 2,818 versus Inverness C.T. 13 May 2009
 Highest home European attendance: 11,318 versus  AS Nancy, 2 October 2008
 Lowest home European attendance: 4,307 versus  Llanelli, 2 July 2009

Transfer fees
 Highest transfer fee paid: £500,000 for John Spencer from Everton, 1999
 Highest transfer fee received: £3,000,000 for David Turnbull to Celtic, 2020

See also
List of Motherwell F.C. seasons

Sources

Notes

References

External links
 Motherwell F.C. Records Section
 Motherwell F.C. Statistics at Statto.com
 Motherwell F.C. statistics at UEFA

Records
Motherwell
Records